The 2016 Mid-American Conference football season was the 71st season for the Mid-American Conference (MAC) and was part of the 2016 NCAA Division I FBS football season.

Previous season

Preseason

Preseason poll
On July 28, 2016, the conference held its MAC Football Media Day. A poll of the league's media members was conducted. Western Michigan and Bowling Green were chosen to win their respective divisions while Western Michigan was predicted to win the MAC Championship game.

East Division

West Division

MAC Championship Game winner

Head coaches

East Division

West Division

Pre-season coaching changes

Regular season

Postseason awards

2016 MAC Specialty Award Winners
Coach of The Year – P. J. Fleck, Western Michigan
Freshman of the Year – Javon Hagan, Ohio
Offensive Player of the Year – Corey Davis, Western Michigan
Defensive Player of the Year – Tarell Basham, Ohio
Special Teams Player of the Year – Darius Phillips, Western Michigan
Vern Smith Leadership Award Winner – Zach Terrell, Western Michigan

All Conference Teams
2016 All–MAC First Team Offense
Quarterback – Logan Woodside, Toledo
Offensive Linemen – Taylor Moton, Western Michigan 
Offensive Lineman – Storm Morton, Toledo
Offensive Lineman – Chukwuma Okorafor, Western Michigan
Offensive Lineman – Max Scharping, Northern Illinois
Offensive Lineman – Mike Ebert, Toledo
Tight End – Michael Roberts, Toledo
Wide Receiver – Corey Davis, Western Michigan
Wide Receiver – Kenny Golladay, Northern Illinois
Wide Receiver – Cody Thompson, Toledo
Wide Receiver – Scott Miller, Bowling Green
Running Back – Kareem Hunt, Toledo
Running Back – James Gilbert, Ball State
Placekicker – Louis Zervos, Ohio

2016 All–MAC First team Defense
Outside Linebacker – Blair Brown, Ohio
Outside Linebacker – Ulysees Gilbert, Akron
Inside Linebacker – Quentin Poling, Ohio
Inside Linebacker – Malik Fountain, Central Michigan
Down Lineman – Tarell Basham, Ohio
Down Lineman – Terence Waugh, Kent State
Down Lineman – John Stepec, Toledo
Down Lineman – Pat O'Connor, Eastern Michigan
Defensive Back – Darius Phillips, Western Michigan
Defensive Back – Amari Coleman, Central Michigan
Defensive Back – Heath Harding, Miami
Defensive Back – Najee Murray, Kent State 
Punter – Joe Davidson, Bowling Green

2016 All–MAC First Team Specialists
Kickoff Return Specialist – Aregeros Turnerm, Northern Illinois 
Punt Return Specialist – JoJo Natson, Akron

2016 All–MAC Second Team Offense
Quarterback – Zach Terrell, Western Michigan
Offensive Lineman – John Keenoy, Western Michigan
Offensive Lineman – Troy Watson, Ohio
Offensive Lineman – Levon Myers, Northern Illinois
Offensive Lineman – Collin Buchanan, Miami
Tight End – Mason Schreck, Buffalo
Wide Receiver – Corey Willis, Central Michigan
Wide Receiver – Kevonn Mabon, Ball State
Wide Receiver – Jon'Vea Johnson, Toledo
Wide Receiver – Jojo Natson, Akron
Running Back – Jarvion Franklin, Western Michigan
Running Back – Joel Bouagnon, Northern Illinois
Placekicker – Paul Fricano, Eastern Michigan

2016 All–MAC Second Team Defense
Outside Linebacker – Trenton Greene, Bowling Green
Outside Linebacker – Asantay Brown, Western Michigan
Inside Linebacker – Robert Spillane, Western Michigan
Inside Linebacker – Khalil Hodge, Buffalo
Down Lineback – Joe Ostman, Central Michigan
Down Lineback – JT Jones, Miami
Down Lineback – Treyvon Hester, Toledo
Down Lineback – Keion Adams, Western Michigan
Defensive Back – Shawun Lurry, Northern Illinois
Defensive Back – Dejuan Rogers, Toledo
Defensive Back – Javon Hagan, Ohio
Defensive Back – Jerrell Foster, Kent State
Punter – Austin Barnes, Eastern Michigan

2016 All–MAC Second Team Specialists
Kickoff Return Specialist – Darius Phillips, Western Michigan
Punt Return Specialist – Darius Phillips, Western Michigan

2016 All–MAC Third Team Offense
Quarterback – Cooper Rush, Central Michigan
Offensive Lineman – Andrew Wylie, Eastern Michigan
Offensive Lineman – Jake Pruehs, Ohio
Offensive Lineman – Tim Mcauiffe, Bowling Green
Offensive Lineman – Logan Dietz, Bowling Green
Tight End – Donnie Ernsberger, Western Michigan
Wide Receiver – Jerome Lane, Akron
Wide Receiver – Sebastian Smith, Ohio
Wide Receiver – Sergion Bradley, Eastern Michigan
Wide Receiver – James Gardner, Miami
Running Back – Jordan Johnson, Buffalo
Running Back – Fred Coppet, Bowling Green
Placekicker – Tom O'Leary, Akron

2016 All–MAC Third Team Defense
Outside Linebacker – Sean Wiggins, Ball State
Outside Linebacker – De'Andre Montgomery, Miami
Inside Linebacker – Ju'Wuan Woodley Toledo
Inside Linebacker – Junior McMullen, Miami
Down Lineman – Jeremiah Harris, Eastern Michigan
Down Lineman – Jon Cunningham, Kent State
Down Lineman – Casey Sayles, Ohio
Down Lineman – Anthony Winbush, Ball State
Defensive Back – Justin Ferguson, Western Michigan
Defensive Back – Josh Cox, Central Michigan
Defensive Back – Daquan Pace, Eastern Michigan
Defensive Back – Jamari Bozeman, Bowling Green 
Punter – Michael Farkas, Ohio

2016 All–MAC Third Team Specialists
Kickoff Return Specialist – Maurice Thomas, Miami 
Punt Return Specialist – Corey Jones, Toledo

Bowl Games
Six MAC schools participated in bowl games.

NOTE: All times are local

Home game attendance

Bold – Exceed capacity
†Season High

References